Wien Geiselbergstraße is a railway station serving Simmering, the eleventh district of Vienna. It is located on an elevated s-curve and was built during the 2002 relocation of parts of the Aspangbahn.

References 

Railway stations in Vienna
Austrian Federal Railways